

Headulacus was a medieval Bishop of Elmham.

Headulacus was consecrated before 731 and died sometime after that date.

Notes

References

External links
 

Bishops of Elmham